Person-centered therapy, also known as person-centered psychotherapy, person-centered counseling, client-centered therapy and Rogerian psychotherapy, is a form of psychotherapy developed by psychologist Carl Rogers beginning in the 1940s and extending into the 1980s. Person-centered therapy seeks to facilitate a client's self-actualizing tendency, "an inbuilt proclivity toward growth and fulfillment", via acceptance (unconditional positive regard), therapist congruence (genuineness), and empathic understanding.

History and influences
Person-centered therapy was developed by Carl Rogers in the 1940s and 1950s, and was brought to public awareness largely through his highly influential book Client-centered Therapy, published in 1951. It has been recognized as one of the major types of psychotherapy (theoretical orientations), along with psychodynamic psychotherapy, psychoanalysis, classical Adlerian psychology, cognitive behavioral therapy, existential therapy, and others. Its underlying theory arose from the results of empirical research; it was the first theory of therapy to be driven by empirical research, with Rogers at pains to reassure other theorists that "the facts are always friendly". Originally called non-directive therapy, it "offered a viable, coherent alternative to Freudian psychotherapy. ... [Rogers] redefined the therapeutic relationship to be different from the Freudian authoritarian pairing." 

Person-centered therapy is often described as a humanistic therapy, but its main principles appear to have been established before those of humanistic psychology. Some have argued that "it does not in fact have much in common with the other established humanistic therapies", but by the mid-1960s Rogers accepted being categorized with other humanistic (or phenomenological-existential) psychologists in contrast to behavioral and psychoanalytic psychologists. Despite the importance of the self to person-centered theory, the theory is fundamentally organismic and holistic in nature, with the individual's unique self-concept at the center of the unique "sum total of the biochemical, physiological, perceptual, cognitive, emotional and interpersonal behavioural subsystems constituting the person".

Rogers coined the term counselling in the 1940s because at that time psychologists were not legally permitted to provide psychotherapy in the US. Only medical practitioners were allowed to use the term psychotherapy to describe their work.

Rogers affirmed individual personal experience as the basis and standard for living and therapeutic effect. This emphasis contrasts with the dispassionate position which may be intended in other therapies, particularly the behavioral therapies. Hallmarks of Rogers's person-centered therapy include: living in the present rather than the past or future; organismic trust; naturalistic faith in one's own thoughts and the accuracy in one's feelings; a responsible acknowledgment of one's freedom; and a view toward participating fully in our world and contributing to other peoples' lives. Rogers also claimed that the therapeutic process is, in essence, composed of the accomplishments made by the client. The client, having already progressed further along in their growth and maturation development, only progresses further with the aid of a psychologically favored environment.

Although client-centered therapy has been criticized by behaviorists for lacking structure and by psychoanalysts for actually providing a conditional relationship, it has been shown to be an effective treatment.

The necessary and sufficient conditions 
Rogers (1957; 1959) stated that there are six necessary and sufficient conditions required for therapeutic change:

 Therapist–client psychological contact: A relationship between client and therapist must exist, and it must be a relationship in which each person's perception of the other is important.
 Client incongruence: Incongruence (as defined by Carl Rogers; "a lack of alignment between the real self and the ideal self") exists between the client's experience and awareness.
 Therapist congruence, or genuineness: The therapist is congruent within the therapeutic relationship; the therapist is deeply involved—they are not "acting"—and they can draw on their own experiences (self-disclosure) to facilitate the relationship.
 Therapist unconditional positive regard: The therapist accepts the client unconditionally, without judgment, disapproval, or approval. This facilitates increased self-regard in the client, as they can begin to become aware of experiences in which their view of self-worth was distorted or denied.
 Therapist empathic understanding: The therapist experiences an empathic understanding of the client's internal frame of reference. Accurate empathy on the part of the therapist helps the client believe the therapist's unconditional regard for them.
 Client perception: The client perceives, to at least a minimal degree, the therapist's unconditional positive regard and empathic understanding.

Core conditions
It is believed that the most important factor in successful person-centered therapy is the relational climate created by the therapist's attitude to their client. The therapist's attitude is defined by the three conditions focused on the therapist, which are often called the core conditions (3,4, and 5 of the six conditions):
 Congruence: The therapist is willing to transparently relate to clients without hiding behind a professional or personal facade.
 Unconditional positive regard: The therapist offers an acceptance and prizing of their client for who they are without conveying disapproving feelings, actions, or characteristics and demonstrating a willingness to attentively listen without interruption, judgement, or giving advice.
 Empathy: The therapist communicates their desire to understand and appreciate their client's perspective.

Processes
Rogers believed that a therapist who embodies the three critical and reflexive attitudes (the three core conditions) will help liberate their client to more confidently express their true feelings without fear of judgement. To achieve this, the client-centered therapist carefully avoids directly challenging their client's way of communicating themselves in the session in order to enable a deeper exploration of the issues most intimate to them and free from external referencing. Rogers was not prescriptive in telling his clients what to do, but believed that the answers to the clients' questions were within the client and not the therapist. Accordingly, the therapist's role was to create a facilitative, empathic environment wherein the client could discover the answers for themselves.

See also
 Humanistic psychology
 Critical psychology
 Human Potential Movement
 ELIZA

References

Bibliography

External links

 World Association for Person-Centered and Experiential Psychotherapy and Counseling
 The Person-Centered Website
 An Introduction to Person-Centred Counselling at CounsellingResource.com
 The Carl Rogers Bibliography Online
 Person-Centered Bibliography
 Person-Centered Bibliography in French
 Association for Person Centered Therapy Scotland 
 The Association for the Development of the Person Centered Approach
 Network of the European Associations for Person-Centered and Experiential Psychotherapy and Counseling
 The British Association for the Person Centered Approach

Psychotherapies